Doorbeen is a 2014 Bengali thriller film directed by Swagato Chowdhury and produced by Saikat Mitra. The score was composed by Saikat Mitra.

Cast 
 Soumitra Chatterjee as Byomkesh Bakshi
 Sabyasachi Chakraborty as Feluda
 Shantilal Mukherjee as Gobinda Gargori
 Anjana Basu as Pupul's mother
 Aparajita Auddy as Madhabi Dutta
 Rangeet as Pupul
 Diptodeep as Tatai
 Ahana as Bhebli
 Subrato Guha Roy
 Rajat Ganguly
 Pratik Chowdhury
 Aritra Dutta
 Pradip Chakraborty
 Debranjan Nag
 Arunabha Dutta
 Nitya Ganguly
 Tapas Biswas
 Sanjib Sarkar
 Ranjan Bandyopadhyay

Critical reception

Madhusree Ghosh of The Times of India gave the movie 3 out of 5 stars and wrote, "Unfortunately, the director, riding high on the excitement of doing something mind-blowing, messes up that balance quite a few times. The weak and predictable plot also doesn't help things much."

References 

Bengali-language Indian films
2010s Bengali-language films
2010s thriller films
Indian detective films
Indian children's films
Feluda (series)
Byomkesh Bakshi films